Philip Edward Rushbrook is a British diplomat who served as Governor of Saint Helena, Ascension and Tristan da Cunha from 2019 to 2022. He was inaugurated on 11 May 2019 and became the 66th Governor of Saint Helena and the 69th of Saint Helena, Ascension and Tristan da Cunha. He left office on 20 June 2022.

Biography

Personal life 
The governor is married to Janis Rushbrook and has two children. He is based in Saint Helena and currently resides in the Plantation House, a historic residence for Saint Helena Governors.

Career 
Philip Rushbrook has had many occupations in the Government of the United Kingdom. Previous roles include; Deputy Head of Mission and Director in the Turks and Caicos Islands, Chief officer and deputy governor in sovereign bases, Akrotiri and Dhekelia and National security secretariat.

Early career 
In his early career, Philip Rushbrook worked in environmental services and waste research.

Inauguration ceremony 
On Saturday 11 May 2019, Philip Rushbrook, accompanied by his wife, Janis Rushbrook, were greeted at Saint Helena Airport, and became the first governor to arrive by air to their Inauguration ceremony. He then became sworn in during an afternoon ceremony, where he was greeted by the inhabitants of the island.

References 

Governors of Saint Helena
British colonial governors and administrators in Africa
Commanders of the Order of the British Empire
Place of birth missing (living people)
Date of birth missing (living people)
1958 births
Living people